Freddy O. Fjellheim (born 11 December 1957) is a Norwegian author who made his début in 1983 with 1. Olsen’s Bok. His work is characterized by its literary experimentation and integration of forms and literary genres. He has published poetry, prose, and essays.

Fjellheim is an active participant in current literary debates, and his essays and articles are widely published. He is also a respected literary critic.

Bibliography 
 Bjarte Engers livegenskap, (Cappelen) 2007
 Hvile og slagverk, MMSAY   (Cappelen) 2004
 Kristus kommer   - og Maria,   (Cappelen) 2003
 Føniks,  historier, essays  (Cappelen)  2001
 Ljåens svarte blomst, syklus   (Cappelen)  1999
 Rov, folkelivsskildring   (Cappelen)  1995
 IECUR, parabel   (Cappelen)  1994
 Plexus, essay   (Gyldendal)  1993
 Forbindelser, transkripsjoner, prekener, essays, fortellinger   (October)  1991
 Smargden, sekvenser   (Oktober)  1989
 Scherzo, roman   (Gyldendal)  1987
 1. Olsens Bok, noveller   (Gyldendal)  1983

Norwegian male writers
1957 births
Living people